George Kenneth Tarasovic (May 6, 1930 – October 24, 2019) was an American professional football player of Rusyn or Slovak descent.  He played college football for the Boston College Eagles and LSU Tigers. He played 15 years in the National Football League (NFL) with the Pittsburgh Steelers, Philadelphia Eagles, and Denver Broncos.

His father's family was from a village and municipality located in today's northern Slovakia, part of the former Austro-Hungarian Empire.

College career
Tarasovic played one season at Boston College before leaving the school for personal reasons. After one year of junior college, he transferred to LSU. With the Tigers, he was recognized as an All American offensive lineman and a Southeastern Conference all star as a linebacker.

Professional career
Tarasovic was drafted in the second round of the 1952 NFL Draft by the Pittsburgh Steelers. In his rookie season, he started nine games for Pittsburgh, recovering four fumbles. 

He played 15 seasons in Pro Football, mainly in the National Football League with the Pittsburgh Steelers.  He also spent time with the NFL Philadelphia Eagles and the American Football League's Denver Broncos.

Tarasovic was named to the UPI 2nd team All-NFL squad in 1959, and he is a member of the Western Pennsylvania Football Hall of Fame.  Former New York Giants running back Alex Webster called Tarasovic "One of the toughest SOBs I ever played against."

Personal life
George's brother, Phil Tarasovic, was captain of Yale's football team in 1955 and was also drafted by the Pittsburgh Steelers.

During his career, Tarasovic showed an interest in politics, serving as a Democratic Party committeeman. In 1963, he ran for justice of the peace in his town, but was defeated

After he retired, Tarasovic settled in York, Pennsylvania. He later moved to Savannah, Georgia, where he died on October 24, 2019.

See also
 List of American Football League players

References

1930 births
2019 deaths
All-American college football players
American football linebackers
American people of Slovak descent
American people of Rusyn descent
LSU Tigers football players
Pennsylvania Democrats
Pittsburgh Steelers players
Philadelphia Eagles players
Denver Broncos (AFL) players
People from Granville, New York
Players of American football from New York (state)
Sportspeople from York, Pennsylvania